Mahmoud Shawkat Aqel Musleh (born May 20, 1995) is a Jordanian football player who plays as a midfielder.

References

External links 

soccerkeep.com

1995 births
Living people
Jordanian footballers
Jordanian expatriate footballers
Association football midfielders
Al-Wehdat SC players
Al-Ahli SC (Amman) players
Shabab Al-Aqaba Club players
Al-Nojoom FC players
Saudi Second Division players
Expatriate footballers in Saudi Arabia
Jordanian expatriate sportspeople in Saudi Arabia